An MSX-ENGINE chip is a specially developed integrated circuit for home computers that are built according to the MSX specifications. 
Generally, such a chip combines the functions of many separate, older/simpler chips into one. This is done to reduce required circuit board space, power consumption, and (most importantly) production costs for complete systems.

The first MSX-Engine chip, the T7775 operated next to a standard Zilog Z80-clone chip, the main CPU of the system, but most later versions of the engine also included the Z80 (clone) CPU in a same single chip package. The S-1990, is a special case, as it's not really an MSX-Engine, but a chip that was used as "glue logic" between the MSX-engine and an external R800 CPU.

The T9769 is used in MSX 2 computers, while in MSX 1 computers mostly the T7775 and T7937 are used. You can also find the S-1985 and S-3527 in these systems. After the MSX 2 generation (from MSX2+ onwards) Toshiba took over the complete production of MSX engine chips. The last generation of MSX, the Turbo-R used the NEC S-1990 "TurboR bus controller" together with a R800 CPU.
MSX engine chips from Yamaha were mostly used in MSX-computers from Sony and Philips, while the Toshiba chips were mostly used in computers from Sanyo and Matsushita (Panasonic/National).

Overview 
Here is a short overview of MSX-Engine chips.

MSX 1 
Yamaha S3527

 a Yamaha YM2149 PSG-sound chip, compatible with a General Instrument AY-3-8910
 parallel I/O chip: backward compatible with the Intel i8255
 standard MSX1 functions: DRAM control, slot selection, joystick ports, cassette/printer interface etc.
 100 pins
Note that this IC is also used in many MSX2 computers, but does not include any MSX2-specific functions. In such machines, these are implemented using additional IC's

Sony MB64H131
 Intel i8255
 printer port

Toshiba T7775
 CMOS-chip with all MSX 1 functions.

Toshiba T7937(A)
 main CPU, a Zilog Z80 (clone) with a clock speed of 3,58 MHz.
 PSG-sound chip, compatible with a AY-3-8910
 Video Display Controller: T6950 rev. B (TMS9918 compatible)
 parallel I/O chip: backward compatible with the Intel i8255
 MSX 1-functions
 dimensions: 10,5 × 8,60 mm

 Hitachi HD62003
 AY-3-8910 compatible PSG
 DRAM controller
 PPI i8255 functions

MSX 2/MSX 2+ 

Yamaha S1985
 a Yamaha YM2149 a Programmable Sound Generator - sound chip, compatible with a General Instrument AY-3-8910
 parallel I/O chip: backward compatible with the Intel i8255
 MSX1- and MSX2-functions (up to 512 KB memory mapper)
 Real Time Clock (Ricoh RP5C01A compatible) including 26 x 4 bits RAM, backed up by (separate) battery
 100 pin flat plastic package

Toshiba T9769
 main CPU, a Zilog Z80 clone with a clock speed of 3,58 MHz (MSX2; switchable to 5,36 MHz on some MSX2+ machines)
 a Programmable Sound Generator - sound chip, compatible with a General Instrument AY-3-8910
 parallel I/O chip: backward compatible with the Intel i8255
 MSX1 and MSX2-functions (MSX2-computers)
 MSX2+-functions (MSX2+-computers)
 dimensions: 10,5 × 8,60 mm

MSX Turbo R

NEC S1990, combined with a Toshiba T9769C

The S1990 is not in itself an MSX-engine but acts like "bus controller", it is the combining element that combines 
the Z80 inside the T9769C (the actual MSX engine) and a R800 CPU, and the memory and slot logic and other hardware inside the T9769C. 
It also contains hardware to assists in the debugging of software.

External links
S3527 datasheet
S1985 datasheet

MSX